Aguaytía is a town situated in Peru, capital of the province Padre Abad in the region Ucayali. It is situated on the banks of the Aguaytía River (a tributary of the Ucayali River) at the highway between Pucallpa and Tingo María. It is of interest to those who live in the region as a tourist destination, due to its proximity to the spectacular waterfall "El Velo de la Novia" (The Bridal Veil).

References

External links

Populated places in the Ucayali Region